Clarks Point was a cape on the north side of Yerba Buena Cove in what is now San Francisco, California.
Its former Spanish name was Punta Del Embarcadera.  During the California Gold Rush the Clarks Point and the Cove was filled in to form the Embarcadero on San Francisco Bay.  The location of the Point is just east of the intersection of Battery Street on Broadway.

References

 	
Landforms of San Francisco